Joseph Allan Johnston (28 September 1904 – 15 May 1974) was a Liberal party member of the House of Commons of Canada. He was born in London, Ontario where he was alderman from 1933 to 1935 and mayor from 1938 to 1940. He also became a merchant by career.

Johnston attended public and secondary schools in London. He operated a typewriter business and became a London city alderman from 1933 to 1935, and was the city's mayor from 1938 to 1940.

Johnston was first elected to Parliament at the London riding in the 1940 general election. After one term in the House of Commons, Johnston was defeated by Park Manross in the 1945 election.

References

External links
 

1904 births
1974 deaths
Canadian merchants
Liberal Party of Canada MPs
Mayors of London, Ontario
Members of the House of Commons of Canada from Ontario